The Order of Princess Olga is a Ukrainian civil decoration, featuring Olga of Kiev and bestowed to women for "personal merits in state, production, scientific, educational, cultural, charity and other spheres of social activities, for upbringing children in families". It was established by Presidential Decree № 827/97 of 15 August 1997 and has three grades (classes), the first being the highest. The 1st grade medal is adorned with four rectangular amethysts and features a gilded ornament with silver parts. The two other grades also feature precious stones.

Both Ukrainian citizens and foreigners are eligible for the order. The order can be rescinded by the President of Ukraine if a bearer is convicted of a serious crime.

Selected recipients
 Tetiana Andriienko (1938–2016), Ukrainian botanist, conservationist, and professor.
 Anne Applebaum (1964–), Polish-American historian and journalist
 Marieluise Beck (1952–), member of the Alliance '90/The Greens group in the Bundestag
 Myroslava Gongadze (1972–), Ukrainian journalist living in the United States
 Rebecca Harms (1956–), Member of the European Parliament
 Hanna Havrylets (1958–2022), Ukrainian composer
 Agnieszka Holland (1948–), Polish filmmaker
 Olena Kostevych (1985–), Ukrainian pistol shooter
 Larysa Krushelnytska (1928-2017), Ukrainian archaeologist
 Roberta Metsola (1979–), President of the European Parliament
 Mariya Orlyk (1930–), Ukrainian teacher and politician.
 Atena Pashko (1931–2012), Ukrainian chemical engineer, poet, social activist
 Nancy Pelosi (1940–), 52nd Speaker of the US House of Representatives
 Vera Rich (1936–2009), British poet
 Olha Saladukha (1983–), Ukrainian triple jumper
 Heidemarie Stefanyshyn-Piper (1963–), American astronaut
 Khrystyna Stuy (1988–), Ukrainian sprint athlete
 Melanne Verveer (1944–), United States Ambassador-at-Large for Global Women's Issues
 Oksana Zabuzhko (1960–), Ukrainian novelist
 Jana Černochová (1973–), Czech Minister of Defence

Medals and ribbons

References

Civil awards and decorations of Ukraine
Awards established in 1997
 
1997 establishments in Ukraine